Jetsün Sherab Sengge (1382 or 1383 – 1445)  also known as Je Sherab Sengge, Xirao Sengge, Jizun Xirao Sengge or Jiezun Xirao Sengge was a cleric of the Gelug school of Tibetan Buddhism. In 1433 he founded the Lower Tantra College or the Lower Tantric Faculty (Gyüme Dratshang) in Lhasa.

See also 
 Jetsun

References

External links 

 

Buddhist monks from Tibet
Vajrayana Buddhism in Southeast Asia
Tibetan people
1383 births
1445 deaths
14th-century Tibetan people